General elections were held in Italy on 7 March 1909, with a second round of voting on 14 March. The "ministerial" left-wing bloc remained the largest in Parliament, winning 329 of the 508 seats.

Background
The right-wing leader Sidney Sonnino succeed to Giolitti's protégé Alessandro Fortis as Prime Minister on 1906. But his cabinet had a short lift; anyway Sonnino formed an alliance with France on the colonial expansion in North Africa. His government lasted only few months.

After Sonnino's resignation Giovanni Giolitti returned to power in 1906. Many critics accused Giolitti of manipulating the elections, piling up majorities with the restricted suffrage at the time, using the prefects just as his contenders. However, he did refine the practice in the elections of 1904 and 1909 that gave the liberals secure majorities.

In the election, The Right lost his important position in the Parliament, replaced by the Radical Party of Ettore Sacchi, who became an ally of Giolitti and the Italian Socialist Party of Filippo Turati, which continued its strong opposition to the Left governments.

Electoral system
The election was held using 508 single-member constituencies. However, prior to the election the electoral law was amended so that candidates needed only an absolute majority of votes to win their constituency, abolishing the second requirement of receiving the votes of at least one-sixth of registered voters.

Parties and leaders

Results

Leading party by region

References

General elections in Italy
Italy
General
Italy